A microscope is an instrument used to see objects that are too small to be seen by the naked eye.

Types of microscope include:
 Optical microscope
 Stereo microscope
 Digital microscope
 USB microscope
 Electron microscope
 Scanning electron microscope

Microscope may also refer to:

 MICROSCOPE (MICRO-Satellite à traînée Compensée pour l'Observation du Principe d'Equivalence), a satellite used to test the equivalence principle
 MicroScope (magazine), for the computer industry
 micro_scope, a film production company founded by Luc Déry and Kim McCraw
 Microscope (album), by Riz MC, 2011
 Microscope Gallery, an art gallery in Brooklyn, U.S.
 Microscopium, a constellation

See also
 
 
 Timeline of microscope technology
 Microscope image processing
 Virtual microscope
 Microscopy (research field)
 Microscopy Listserver, for professional microscopy
 Microscopy and Microanalysis journal
 Microscopic (EP)
 Microscopic scale
 Macroscope (disambiguation)